Agon-Coutainville is a commune in the Manche department in the Normandy region in northwestern France.

Population

Heraldry

Personalities
 Berthe Dagmar (1881–1934)
 This is the village of radio personality Madame Leprieur.

See also
Communes of the Manche department

References

Communes of Manche
Populated coastal places in France